CEBRA is a Danish architectural office founded in 2001 by the architects Mikkel Frost, Carsten Primdahl and Kolja Nielsen. Based in Aarhus in Denmark and in Abu Dhabi in the UAE, CEBRA employs a multidisciplinary international staff of 50.

In February 2017 the CEBRA-designed Experimentarium was inaugurated, a science center in Hellerup, near Copenhagen.  In 2013 The Iceberg, a multiple prize-winning housing project, was built in the revitalized harbour area in Aarhus, Denmark.

One of the founding partners, Mikkel Frost, often paints in watercolours cartoonish concepts of some of CEBRA's projects and the whole collection is named "Toons". In autumn 2016 two of these watercolours have been acquired by the Museum for Architectural Drawing in Berlin, Germany. They are now part of the collection among works by Zaha Hadid, Frank Lloyd Wright, Aldo Rossi, Frank Gehry.

Most of CEBRA's projects are within the fields of education, culture and housing.

Selected awards
CEBRA has received a number of prestigious international awards. Among them:
 2015 – ArchDaily Building of the Year 2015, best housing project for the Iceberg
 2015 – The Children's Home of the Future is on the top 40 shortlist for the Mies van der Rohe Award
 2013 – MIPIM Award 2013, best residential development for the Iceberg
 2013 – Architizer A+ Award, best residential mid-rise for the Iceberg
 2008 – CEBRA receives the Nykredit's Architecture Award, Scandinavia's most prestigious architecture award
 2006 – Golden Lion Award at the Venice Biennale for Architecture for Best National Pavilion
 2006 – The Bakkegaard School is nominated for the Mies van der Rohe Award

Selected projects 
- Experimentarium, Copenhagen, Denmark

- The Iceberg, Aarhus, Denmark

- Sustainable School, Dubai, United Arab Emirates

- Smart School, Irkutsk, Russia

- HF & VUC Fyn, Odense, Denmark

- Children’s Home of the Future, Kerteminde, Denmark

- StreetDome, Haderslev, Denmark

- Mesterfjellet School, Larvik, Norway

- Center for Early Childhood Development, Abu Dhabi, United Arab Emirates

References

External links 
 Homepage: http://cebraarchitecture.dk/
 http://cebratoons.blogspot.dk/

Architecture firms of Denmark
Danish companies established in 2001
Design companies established in 2001
Companies based in Aarhus